Julian Felipe Marquez (born May 8, 1990) is an American professional mixed martial artist currently competing in the Middleweight division of the Ultimate Fighting Championship.

Background
Marquez was born and raised in Kansas City, Missouri, and has a brother, Antonio. He played violin and sang in a choir prior to moving to Kearney, Missouri with his mother. It was in the middle school in Kearney, where the troubled Marquez was put in wrestling at his father's behest to learn discipline. Marquez continued wrestling during his attendance in Missouri Valley College before starting mixed martial arts training at the age of 20.

Mixed martial arts career

Early career
Julian Marquez began his professional mixed martial arts career in may of 2014, defeating his opponent Charles Rooks by TKO in just 53 seconds. More than one year later he compiled his second career win. On the 26th February 2016 Marquez suffered his first loss at Bellator 150. After three rounds his opponent Chris Harris was given the unanimous decision win. Julian Marquez went on to win his next three fights in a row including a win over UFC veteran Matt Hamill before debuting in the UFC.

Ultimate Fighting Championship
Julian Marquez participated in Dana White's Contender Series 4 on the 1st August 2017 against Phil Hawes. He won the fight by Knockout after landing a head kick in the second round.

A middleweight bout against Vitor Miranda was expected to take place on December 16, 2017 at UFC on Fox: Lawler vs. dos Anjos However, on December 4, it was announced that Miranda was pulled from the fight, citing injury and was replaced by Darren Stewart. He won the Fight by Submission via guillotine choke in the second round. He was awarded a Fight of the Night bonus award.

Julian Marquez faced Alessio Di Chirico on July 6, 2018 at The Ultimate Fighter 27 Finale. At the weigh-ins, Julian Marquez weighed in at 190 lbs, four pounds over the middleweight limit of 186. He was fined 30% of his fight purse to Di Chirco and the bout proceeded at a catchweight. He lost the fight via split decision. 14 of 17 media members scored the fight for Marquez.

During his bout with Alessio, Julian suffered a fully torn latissimus dorsi, a rare injury, especially to the extent Julian had sustained. This injury led to Julian having to get two separate surgeries and leading him to miss almost two full years.

Marquez was scheduled to face Saparbek Safarov on August 29, 2020 at UFC Fight Night 175. However, the bout was moved to UFC Fight Night 183 in November after Safarov faced travel restrictions related to the COVID-19 pandemic. In turn, Safarov pulled out due to weight cut issues a day before the event and the pairing was canceled once again.

Marquez faced Maki Pitolo on February 13, 2021 at UFC 258. He secured a comeback win via third round anaconda choke. This win earned him a Performance of the Night award. On that same event, he asked popstar Miley Cyrus to be his valentine to which she agreed if he shaved "MC" (Miley's initials) on his chest.

Marquez faced Sam Alvey on April 10, 2021 at UFC on ABC 2. He won the bout via second round rear-naked choke. This win earned him a Fight of the Night award.

Marquez was scheduled to face Jordan Wright on October 16, 2021 at UFC Fight Night 195. At the weigh-ins, Marquez was pulled from his middleweight bout against Wright due to "non-COVID health issues." He never made it to the scale, even though his opponent weighed in within the middleweight non-title fight limit. As a result, the bout was cancelled.

Marquez was scheduled to face Kyle Daukaus on February 19, 2022 at UFC Fight Night 201. However, Marquez was pulled from the event for undisclosed reasons, and he was replaced by Jamie Pickett.

Marquez was scheduled to face Wellington Turman on June 18, 2022 at UFC on ESPN 37,  However, Turman withdrew due to an orbital bone injury and was replaced by Gregory Rodrigues. He lost the bout in the first round after getting knocked out.

Marquez was scheduled to face Deron Winn on December 17, 2022 at UFC Fight Night 216. However, just two days before the event, Winn was forced to withdraw after fainting and falling down a set of stairs, sustaining a minor concussion and the bout was scrapped.

Marquez faced Marc-André Barriault March 4, 2023, at UFC 285. He lost the fight via technical knockout in the second round.

Personal life

Marquez is of Cuban descent through his father, who inspired his nickname. He has a podcast, “Beauty and the Beast”, with pornographic actress Kendra Lust.

Championships and accomplishments

Mixed martial arts
Ultimate Fighting Championship
Fight of the Night (Two times) 
Performance of the Night (One time)

Mixed martial arts record 

|-
|Loss
|align=center|9–4
|Marc-André Barriault
|TKO (punches)
|UFC 285
|
|align=center|2
|align=center|4:12
|Las Vegas, Nevada, United States
|
|-
|Loss
|align=center|9–3
|Gregory Rodrigues
|KO (punches)
|UFC on ESPN: Kattar vs. Emmett
|
|align=center|1
|align=center|3:18
|Austin, Texas, United States
|
|-
|Win
|align=center|9–2
|Sam Alvey
|Technical Submission (rear-naked choke)
|UFC on ABC: Vettori vs. Holland
|
|align=center|2
|align=center|2:07
|Las Vegas, Nevada, United States
|
|-
|Win
|align=center|8–2
|Maki Pitolo
|Submission (anaconda choke)
|UFC 258
|
|align=center|3
|align=center|4:17
|Las Vegas, Nevada, United States
||
|-
|Loss
|align=center|7–2
|Alessio Di Chirico
|Decision (split)
|The Ultimate Fighter: Undefeated Finale 
|
|align=center|3
|align=center|5:00
|Las Vegas, Nevada, United States
|
|-
|Win
|align=center|7–1
|Darren Stewart
|Submission (guillotine choke)
|UFC on Fox: Lawler vs. dos Anjos
|
|align=center|2
|align=center|2:42
|Winnipeg, Manitoba, Canada
|
|-
|Win
|align=center|6–1
|Phil Hawes
|KO (head kick)
|Dana White's Contender Series 4
|
|align=center|2
|align=center|2:20
|Las Vegas, Nevada, United States
|
|-
|Win
|align=center|5–1
|Cameron Olson
|KO (punch)
|LFA 12
|
|align=center|1
|align=center|1:06
|Prior Lake, Minnesota, United States
|
|-
|Win
|align=center|4–1
|Matt Hamill
|TKO (punches)
|Combate Americas: Empire Rising
|
|align=center|1
|align=center|1:22
|Verona, New York, United States
|
|-
|Win
|align=center|3–1
|Idrees Wasi
|TKO (punches)
|Combate Americas: Road to the Championship 5
|
|align=center|2
|align=center|2:05
|Los Angeles, California, United States
|
|-
| Loss
| align=center|2–1
| Chris Harris
|Decision (unanimous)
| Bellator 150
| 
| align=center|3
| align=center|5:00
| Mulvane, Kansas, United States
| 
|-
| Win
| align=center|2–0
|Jesse Jones
| TKO (punches)
| KCF Alliance 14
| 
| align=center|1
| align=center|2:29
| Independence, Missouri, United States
|
|-
| Win
| align=center| 1–0
| Charles Rooks
| TKO (punches)
| Blackout FC 22
| 
| align=center| 1
| align=center| 0:53
| Kansas City, Missouri, United States 
|
|-

See also 
 List of current UFC fighters
 List of male mixed martial artists

References

External links 
  
 

1990 births
Living people
Middleweight mixed martial artists
Mixed martial artists utilizing collegiate wrestling
Mixed martial artists utilizing Brazilian jiu-jitsu
American male mixed martial artists
American sportspeople of Cuban descent
Ultimate Fighting Championship male fighters
American practitioners of Brazilian jiu-jitsu
American male sport wrestlers
Amateur wrestlers